The nine main lines owned by the Romanian national rail transport company Căile Ferate Române represent the most circulated lines in Romania.

History 
The first railway line on Romania's present-day territory was opened on August 20, 1854, and ran between Oravița in Banat and Baziaș, a port on the Danube. From January 12, 1855, the line was operated by the Imperial Royal Privileged Austrian State Railway Company, the Banat province being at that time part of the Austrian Empire. After several improvements in the following months, the line was opened to passenger traffic on November 1, 1856.

References 

Railway lines in Romania
Standard gauge railways in Romania
Căile Ferate Române